The Prévost-Gilbert river (in French: rivière Prévost-Gilbert) is a tributary of the west bank of the Bras Saint-Victor which flows into the Chaudière River; the latter flows northward to empty on the south shore of the St. Lawrence River. It flows in the administrative region of Chaudière-Appalaches, in Quebec, in Canada, in MRC of:
Les Appalaches Regional County Municipality: municipalities Thetford Mines (Robertsonville sector), Adstock (Sacré-Cœur-de-Marie-Partie-Sud sector), Sacré-Cœur-de-Jésus, Sainte-Clotilde-de-Beauce;
Robert-Cliche Regional County Municipality: municipality of Saint-Victor.

Geography 

The main neighboring watersheds of the Prévost-Gilbert River are:
 north side: Nadeau River, Palmer River, Whetstone River, Perry River;
 east side: Chaudière River, Bras Saint-Victor, rivière du Cinq, Noire River;
 south side: Bras Saint-Victor, Fortin-Dupuis River, rivière des Hamel;
 west side: Gagné River, Bécancour River.

From its source, the Prévost-Gilbert River flows over  divided into the following segments:
  southeasterly, in the Pontbriand sector of the city of Thetford Mines, to the limit between the Pontbriand and Robertsonville sectors;
  eastward, to route 112;
  eastward, up to the limit between the sectors of Robertsonville and Sacré-Cœur-de-Marie-Partie-Sud;
  east, to a country road;
  eastward, up to the municipal limit of Sacré-Cœur-de-Jésus;
  towards the south-east, crossing a country road, to the limit of Sainte-Clotilde-de-Beauce;
  eastward, crossing the Ponterlegil dam, up to a road that leads to the municipality of Sainte-Clotilde-de-Beauce and Saint-Victor;
  east, to a country road bridge;
  eastward, up to its confluence.

The Prévost-Gilbert River flows onto the west bank of the Bras Saint-Victor in the municipality of Saint-Victor. This last river flows into the Chaudière river in Beauceville.

Toponymy 
The toponym Rivière Prévost-Gilbert was formalized on October 6, 1983, at the Commission de toponymie du Québec.

See also 

 List of rivers of Quebec

References 

Rivers of Chaudière-Appalaches
Les Appalaches Regional County Municipality